Kaaterskill Falls is an independent American film made in 2000 and released in 2001. It uses plot elements from Roman Polanski's Knife in the Water set, and filmed in, the Catskill Mountains. Directed by Josh Apter and Peter Olsen. It is unrelated to Allegra Goodman's 1998 novel of the same title.

Reception
The film has a 75% rating on Rotten Tomatoes based on 8 reviews.

The New York Times said it is "not a film that stands up to analytical demands for logic and utter consistency of character. But it establishes its ominous mood and tension swiftly."

References

External links
Interview with Josh Apter and Peter Olsen in New England Film.
 

2001 films
Films shot in New York (state)
American remakes of foreign films
Films set in New York (state)
Catskills
2001 drama films
2000s English-language films